Raju Pariyar(born 30 June 1980) is a singer from Nepal. He has recorded more than 13,000 songs as of 2015.

Early and personal life
Pariyar was born in the village of Gausahar which is located in Lamjung District, to Mangal Singh Pariyar and Santa Maya Pariyar. He was born on 15 Ashad 2037 BS or around 30 June 1980 in the Gregorian calendar.

In September 2015 Pariyar met Bishnu Pariyar (no relation) on a flight from Kathmandu to Mumbai. Bishnu, a Christian pastor from Bharatpur, conversed with Pariyar during the flight and interested him in his religion. A month latter Pariyar and his wife and two children traveled to Bishnu's church in Bharatpur and converted to Christianity.

Career
Pariyar is an extremely popular singer in Nepal. A song he did with Priya Bhandari is one of the most viewed Nepalese songs on the web with over 500,000 views on YouTube. Pariyar often returns to perform in his home district of Lamjung.

Discography

Music albums
Poila Jana Pam (2008)

Famous songs
Lalupate Nugyo (2008)
Hatma Rato Jhola (2009)
Dhago Ramro Resham Kirako (2009)
Balapanle Bai Bhanyo (2010)
Timlai Chino (2011)
Hai Barai (2011)
Aadhi khola urlera aayo 
Jhim Jhim Sanu najhimkau pareli
Gangajiko pani
Phool ma mahuri
Maaf gara bhul bhaye
Mirmireko gham 
Dura dade dai 
Dali palayo  tar maya palaina 
Nayuli baru dali mai nidayo  
रुदै रुदै जान्छु मेलामा
(2009)

References

Living people
People from Lamjung District
21st-century Nepalese male singers
Nepalese folk singers
Converts to Christianity from Hinduism
Nepalese Christians
Khas people
1980 births